Nico Erik Rosberg (born 27 June 1985) is a German-Finnish former professional racing driver. The only child of Finnish  Formula One World Champion Keke Rosberg and his German wife Sina Rosberg, he was raised primarily in the Principality of Monaco.

Rosberg began competitive go-kart racing at the age of six and achieved early success, winning regional and national French championships, before moving to European-based series and world championships. At the age of 16, he progressed to car racing, winning nine races to claim the 2002 Formula BMW ADAC Championship with VIVA Racing. He subsequently moved to the higher-tier Formula 3 Euro Series with Team Rosberg in 2003 and 2004 before winning the inaugural GP2 Series championship with ART Grand Prix in 2005.

For , he moved to Mercedes, partnering fellow German and seven-time world champion Michael Schumacher.

Rosberg announced his retirement from motor racing five days after clinching the title, citing wanting to spend more time with his family and not wanting his driving ability to atrophy as the main factors behind his decision. Overall he competed in 206 Grands Prix, winning 23, securing 57 podium finishes, 30 pole positions, and amassing 1594.5 championship points. In retirement, Rosberg moved into driver management, television punditry, and became an eco-entrepreneur. He was awarded the Laureus World Sports Award for Breakthrough of the Year and was inducted into the FIA Hall of Fame in 2017.

Personal background and education

Rosberg was born on 27 June 1985 at the Red Cross Hospital in Wiesbaden, West Germany, the only child of Finnish racing driver Keke Rosberg, who won the  Formula One World Championship, and German interpreter Gesine "Sina" Rosberg (formerly Gleitsmann-Dengel). Because his father is Finnish and his mother is German, Rosberg is a citizen of both countries, competing with a Finnish racing license until after his first season in the Formula 3 Euro Series. He switched to a German license as he felt it was easier to obtain major sponsorship agreements with nationality of a larger country.

Rosberg was raised in the Wiesbaden district of Nordenstadt in the first four weeks of his life, before living between the principality of Monaco and the Spanish island of Ibiza. He was educated at the International School of Nice and the International School of Monaco. Rosberg was encouraged to pursue ventures in academia and sports. He was taught five languages: English, French, German, Italian and Spanish, but not Finnish or Swedish, as his father considered those other languages more important for Nico's life and career. Rosberg enjoyed studying mathematics and science, and passed all of his examinations except history. He graduated with an average grade of 1.2 in 2002.

Rosberg married interior designer Vivian Sibold at a civil ceremony in Monaco on 11 July 2014. They have two children, Alaïa (born 2015) and Naila (born 2017), and run a creamery shop in Ibiza. He is a fan of the German football club FC Bayern Munich, played for the Monaco national tennis team, and formerly competed in triathlon events; these skills allowed him to save a five-year-old child from drowning in Monaco.

Karting (1991–2001)
At the age of four, Rosberg had his first driving experience when his father took him to a go-kart track in Ibiza for a holiday. He steered a Jeep, and his father controlled its speed with the accelerator and the brake pedals. Rosberg began competitive racing at the age of six and decided to aim for a career in Formula One motor racing after he observed his father competing in the Deutsche Tourenwagen Meisterschaft in 1995. His parents, who did not discourage their son's career choice, consented on the condition that he maintained good grades at school. Rosberg's competitive mindset, and his early achievements in go-karting helped him to improve his driving ability and to convince his father to manage him.

In 1996, Rosberg won the Côte d'Azur Mini-Kart Regional Championship, and the Trophee Jérôme Bernard and the Trophee de France in 1997. Aged 12, he was the youngest champion of a French national karting series. Rosberg finished second in the French Manufacturers' Trophy and the Côte d'Azur Regional Championship in the same year. He progressed to the European karting championships for 1998 after moving from France to Italy so he could enter international events. Competing in the 100 Junior category in a CRG kart, Rosberg finished fifth at the 28° Torneo Industrie, seventh in the Trofeo Andrea Margutti, and crashed out in the 1998 Green Helmet Trophy Cadets class of the European Championship for Cadets. In 1999, he was runner-up in the Italian Junior Karting Championship and was fourth in the ICA Junior CIK-FIA European Championship, again driving a CRG.

Rosberg's father asked CRG executive Dino Chiesa in late 1999 to establish a separate karting team for his son and fellow driver Lewis Hamilton for a period of two to three years. Rosberg raced for TeamMBM.com (Mercedes-Benz McLaren) for the 2000 season. He was runner-up in the European KF1 Championship and finished ninth in the Formula A World Cup. In 2001, Rosberg was tenth in the South Garda Winter Cup and sixteenth in the Formula Super A World Championship. He concluded his karting career with a third-place finish in the latter series at a race in Kerpen.

Junior car career (2001–2005)

At the age of 16, Rosberg progressed to car racing, competing in three races for the 2001 Formula BMW Junior Cup Iberia finishing in 18th in the Drivers' Championship with 38 points. For his first full season of car racing, he drove for VIVA Racing in the 2002 Formula BMW ADAC Championship, winning the drivers' title with nine victories from twenty races and amassing 264 points. For winning the title, Rosberg drove a Williams FW24 at a test session at the Circuit de Catalunya on 3 December. At the time, he became the youngest person ever to drive a Formula One car.

The 2003 season saw Rosberg progress to the higher-tier Formula 3 Euro Series with Team Rosberg. Driving a Dallara F303-Opel car, he won once at the Bugatti Circuit and took five podium finishes for eighth in the Drivers' Championship with 45 points. He was second in the Rookie Cup to Christian Klien. In November 2003, Rosberg was given a test in a Formula 3000 car at the Circuito de Jerez by Paolo Coloni, the team owner of Scuderia Coloni, as preparation for future F1 testing with Williams. That same month, he entered the Macau Grand Prix and the Korea Super Prix with Carlin Motorsport, finishing 11th in Korea. Rosberg tested twice more for Williams in a modified FW25A car at the Circuit de Catalunya in December and January 2004 for them to evaluate his ability as a test driver.

He remained with Team Rosberg for the 2004 Formula 3 Euro Series. Before that, Rosberg won two rounds of the Spanish Formula 3 Winter Series at the Circuito de Albacete as preparation. He won the season's first two races at the Hockenheimring and his campaign faltered through incidents and accidents: he took one other victory at the Nürburgring and three podium finishes. Rosberg finished fourth in the Drivers' Championship with 70 points and was sixth at the Masters of Formula 3. He later crashed from the lead of the Macau Grand Prix in November and was second at the Bahrain Superprix a month later.

In the off-season, he passed an interview for acceptance into Imperial College London, a university where several Formula One designers were educated, to study aeronautical engineering. Rosberg chose not to further his education so as to be able to commit to his racing career; the university would have allowed him to combine the course with his racing. Rosberg's father did not overturn the decision. For the inaugural GP2 Series season in 2005, Rosberg wanted to drive for BCN Competicion due to its form in the 2004 International Formula 3000 Championship. ART Grand Prix founders Nicolas Todt and Frédéric Vasseur used a sales presentation to persuade him to race for their squad; he paid around £850,000 to drive for the team.

Rosberg achieved his first series victory in the sprint race at the Circuit de Nevers Magny-Cours and won the feature races at Silverstone Circuit and the Hockenheimring from pole position. He took the Drivers' Championship lead with a third-place finish in the feature race at the Circuit de Spa-Francorchamps when previous leader Heikki Kovalainen took eighth. Rosberg maintained the points lead during the season-ending Bahrain International Circuit round, winning both races to claim the first GP2 Series title with 120 points.

Formula One career (2005–2016)

Williams (2005–2009)

2005
In April 2005, Rosberg was signed by Williams as its second test driver. He and fellow driver Nelson Piquet Jr. were analysed extensively before Rosberg was selected. He worked with Williams's test and reserve driver Antônio Pizzonia and continued to focus on the GP2 Series. The team opted for Pizzonia because they did not want to risk delaying Rosberg's career by one to two years if he had a poor performance.

2006–2007

Bernie Ecclestone, Formula One's commercial rights owner, said to Williams team principal and founder Frank Williams he thought it would be advantageous to sign Rosberg as part of a campaign to bring energetic drivers to the sport. Williams told Rosberg in October 2005 that he was assured of a role on the team as either a racer or test driver for  after British American Racing's Jenson Button was released from a contract with the team. Autosport reported Rosberg signed a contract that month to race for Williams in 2006 allowing the team to provide him with as much car acclimatisation as possible. The following month, Rosberg signed a five-year contract with Williams, being selected by Frank Williams for his driving ability, his knowledge of Formula One technology, and for articulately communicating data to engineers. He was told of the news by his father in advance.

To prepare for the season, he achieved the highest score ever in Williams's Engineering Aptitude Test, which tests a new driver's knowledge of car mechanics and engineering aspects of Formula One, and ceased reading the news to avoid becoming angered by negative publicity. He was assigned race engineer Tony Ross. At the season-opening , Rosberg scored his first career points with a seventh-place finish and set the race's fastest lap, becoming at the time the youngest fastest lap setter in history, aged 20 years, 8 months and 13 days. Rosberg was outpaced by his teammate Mark Webber, with whom he had a good relationship. He finished with 4 points for 17th in the World Drivers' Championship (WDC).

For , Rosberg was partnered by the more experienced Alexander Wurz. He and his father mutually agreed to stop working with each other, and began working with a sports psychologist. Rosberg's performances improved greatly from 2006 due to Williams restructuring itself and employing more experienced and capable personnel, making his FW29 car reliable and more efficient with the installation of a less complex seamless transmission. He had more confidence in setting up the car to his liking, extracting additional speed and balance consistently. Rosberg also gained experience in controlling his emotions without losing speed, frequently qualified ahead of Wurz and took points seven times with a season-best of fourth at the season-ending . Rosberg scored 20 points for ninth in the WDC.

McLaren offered Frank Williams "majestic proportions" to sign Rosberg to replace the outgoing two-time world champion Fernando Alonso, but Williams immediately rejected the offer. Rosberg later told Williams of his desire to remain with them on the condition he would receive a competitive car.

2008–2009

The 2008 season was the first in which Rosberg was the more experienced driver on his team, being partnered by Williams test driver Kazuki Nakajima. Afterwards, his campaign faltered because the FW30 car lacked outright performance and Williams did not develop the car fast enough for it to be competitive. Rosberg was occasionally outperformed by Nakajima, and driver errors lost him chances to score more points; he was able to adapt to a ban on traction control from Formula One. He improved the best result of his career with a second at the inaugural  14 races later, and finished 13th in the WDC with 17 points.

Rosberg was again partnered with Nakajima for the 2009 season. Rosberg had an improved season: the Williams FW31 was one of three cars to have an early speed advantage because it featured a double diffuser system, however, the team could not sustain the car's pace of development. He scored 34.5 points for seventh in the WDC.

Mercedes (2010–2016)

2010–2012

In mid-to-late 2009, Mercedes-Benz vice-president of motorsport Norbert Haug discussed with Rosberg the possibility of driving for the manufacturer in  pending its acquisition of Brawn GP. Rosberg also talked to McLaren and Williams about potential employment; he was skeptical because Williams was mulling over whether Renault or Cosworth should be the team's engine supplier. On 29 October, he confirmed his departure from Williams at the conclusion of the season and was officially released from his contract with the team on 1 January 2010. One week later Mercedes purchased 75 percent of Brawn GP and entered Formula One under its own name, employing Rosberg to drive for the team. He was partnered with the seven-time world champion Michael Schumacher and was assigned car  4 after Schumacher requested No. 3 for superstitious reasons.

Rosberg was mentored by Mercedes team principal Ross Brawn and was apprehensive when Schumacher joined the team, given the history of Brawn and Schumacher's relationship at Ferrari. He was concerned that Schumacher would dominate the team, and in early strategy meetings, found that his own strategy was being discussed with Schumacher more than with him. He felt that Schumacher was constantly acting to cause him minor stress or to assert dominance.

He scored championship points in all but four rounds; he generally finished higher than he qualified and did so against his teammate Schumacher fifteen times to four that season. He was better able than Schumacher to cope with a terminal understeer affecting the MGP W01's handling due to Mercedes forgoing much development work on the car because of Brawn GP's title focus the previous year. The car was five-tenths of a second slower on most circuits. Rosberg was seventh in the WDC with 142 points. His performances during the season enhanced his reputation as a consistent and fast driver.

Rosberg was able to maintain a consistent performance in every qualifying session and began higher than his teammate Schumacher sixteen times to three. He finished no higher than fifth in the season's 19 rounds and was seventh in the WDC with 89 points.

In November 2011, he signed a contract extension to remain at Mercedes until after . An important factor in Rosberg's decision was the Mercedes team undergoing a technical restructure, which saw the appointments of Bob Bell as technical director and Geoff Willis as head of technology in mid-2011. Other reasons included his belief Mercedes would be able to improve their performance and challenge for race victories.

Three-time world champion Niki Lauda began to advise Rosberg. He then challenged Red Bull's Mark Webber for the victory at the  three races later before he settled for a second-place finish. Rosberg had accumulated more championship points than any other driver in the season's previous four races and emerged as an unlikely contender for the WDC. Notwithstanding this, he achieved one further top-five finish during the season. However, he struggled to generate temperature into the rear tires on the Mercedes F1 W03 regardless of the climatic conditions, and the car was suited to circuits with slow-speed corners. He was ninth in the WDC with 93 points.

2013–2016

Before the 2013 season, Rosberg was joined at Mercedes by the 2008 world champion Lewis Hamilton, who replaced the retired Michael Schumacher. He was granted equal status by Mercedes and received no preferential treatment alongside Hamilton. During the pre-season period, Rosberg visited the Mercedes factory in Brackley, England, displaying a fascination with the F1 W04's technological development and assisting the team in the car's development.

Rosberg challenged his teammate Hamilton during the season qualifying higher eight times and finishing more often. He finished sixth in the WDC with 171 points and three pole positions. Rosberg's results over the season earned him additional respect within the Formula One community.

He was regarded as a favourite for the WDC because of the team's development of the F1 W05 Hybrid car and adaptation to the technical regulations mandating the use of turbo-hybrid engines in pre-season testing at the Bahrain International Circuit and the Circuit de Barcelona-Catalunya. Victories in Austria, Germany, followed by contact with Hamilton in Belgium made it appear he would win the championship, until a short circuit on his car in Singapore nullified his points lead. To win the title, he needed to win the race with Hamilton third or lower. Hamilton was already ahead of Rosberg on track and leading the race when an energy recovery system failure meant Rosberg scored no points for second in the WDC with 317 points.

During the off-season he sought to correct a body deficiency, which caused him to hold his breath against g-forces in high-speed corners, since he did not want to limit the flow of oxygen to his brain and muscles. After four top-three podium finishes in the first four races, he won in Spain, Monaco and Austria, which came as his overall performance lowered from focusing more on the race than on qualifying; Vettel threatened Rosberg's hold on second overall. Retirements in Italy and Russia and two errors on a wet track at the  stopped him from taking the championship, but wins in the final three races in Mexico, Brazil and Abu Dhabi and six consecutive pole positions placed him runner-up overall with 322 points.

Before the 2016 season, Rosberg stopped reading the news and studied sleep with a jet-lag doctor as he focused on his family and winning the next event. He altered his racing gloves to improve his starts, removed paint from his helmet to make it  lighter that slightly improved his performance, employed a mental trainer to increase his aggression, and spent his spare time go-karting to maintain his ability. Rosberg eschewed Facebook for five months, studied philosophy, meditated to stay concentrated, and received detailed technical input from Mercedes's mechanics at its headquarters in Brackley, England. He worked with his sports psychologist for up to eight hours per week with two hours of mental discipline every two days. Rosberg said he was confident of driving a competitive car and wanted to maintain his form by beating Hamilton more regularly.

He carried over his form from the 2015 season, winning the first four races to lead Hamilton by 43 championship points although Hamilton suffered reliability issues in two of those first four races. Rosberg and Hamilton made high-speed contact at the  after which Hamilton took the championship lead from Rosberg over the next eight races after sub-par results from the former. During the mid-season interval, Mercedes non-executive chairman Niki Lauda paid a special visit to Rosberg's home in Ibiza, to help Rosberg regain his confidence and to bounce back. Rosberg changed his diet to remove sugars from his body and abstained from alcohol. Rosberg mulled over how to further improve his performance; to avoid the strain of starting a diet, he refrained from cycling, losing  of muscle in both his legs. He went on to win in Belgium, Singapore and Japan, and achieved three-second-place finishes in a row to enter the season-ending  leading Hamilton by 12 points.

To win the championship, Rosberg needed to finish no worse than third, even if Hamilton won. He won the WDC by five points with a second-place finish after withstanding Hamilton's attempts to back him into the chasing pack and encourage drivers to pass Rosberg to claim the title for himself. He published a limited-edition book entitled Finally about the 2016 season on 24 December 2016. Overall, Rosberg competed in 206 races: he won 23, achieved 30 pole positions, gained 57 podium finishes, and scored 1594.5 championship points.

Retirement from motor racing (2016–present)

He discussed it twice with his wife Vivian before the Abu Dhabi Grand Prix and decided to commit to retiring before the race commenced. Afterwards, Rosberg told Vivian and manager Georg Noite that he would retire before telephoning the Mercedes team principal Toto Wolff about it. He did not tell Wolff in person because he was apprehensive about Wolff's reaction. At an FIA Prize Giving Ceremony in Vienna on 2 December 2016, five days after winning the championship, he made public his decision to retire. Rosberg said he had reached the "pinnacle" of his career; he did not want his driving skills to atrophy and wished to spend more time with his young family. He was the first reigning champion to retire from Formula One since Alain Prost in 1993. Williams driver Valtteri Bottas replaced Rosberg at Mercedes.

In retirement, Rosberg's love of engineering and innovation saw him become an eco-entrepreneur by investing in positive change to the environment and society. He used his celebrity status to advance the industry, beginning with a fact-finding visit to Silicon Valley, where he tested and observed the construction of electric and self-driving vehicles. In July 2017, he visited the headquarters of the all-electric Formula E racing series, and became fascinated in the e-mobility movement. Rosberg became a long-term investor and shareholder in Formula E in early 2018. Focusing primarily on Europe, Rosberg has invested in multiple start-up technology and e-mobility companies, and had the idea to launch the annual Greentech Festival trade fair, which he did with the entrepreneurs Sven Krüger and Marco Voigt in February 2019 to showcase sustainable technologies from around the world in Berlin. He replaced Frank Thelen as an investor on the German television programme Die Höhle der Löwen ('The Lions' Cave') in late 2019.

In October 2017, Rosberg joined Team Rosberg as an adviser for its ADAC GT Masters sports car championship team in 2018. He also joined the management team of the racing driver Robert Kubica that September. Rosberg assisted in Kubica's desire to return to Formula One after a severe 2011 rally accident left the latter with partial movement in his right arm. He reduced his involvement with Kubica in April 2018 to focus on his business career. Since the 2018 season, Rosberg has analysed select Formula One races for Sky Sports F1 in the United Kingdom, RTL in Germany, and Sky Italia in Italy. He impressed viewers for conveying digestible information to them. That same year, Rosberg co-founded the Rosberg Young Drivers Academy with karting mentor Dino Chiesa to scout and support young go-kart drivers. In April 2019, Rosberg declined an offer from the Head of Audi Motorsport Dieter Gass to drive an RS5 DTM as a wild-card entrant in the Deutsche Tourenwagen Masters (DTM) because he did not feel fit enough to return to racing.

In late 2020, he established Rosberg X Racing formed on parts of the structure of his father's DTM team to compete in the all-electric SUV off-road racing series Extreme E from the 2021 season on. He entered the series because of its promised racing action and wanted to help combat some of climate change's effects collectively. In 2021 Rosberg X Racing won the inaugural Extreme E constructors' title with Johan Kristoffersson and Molly Taylor as drivers.

Rosberg has a YouTube vlogging channel and hosts the podcast "Beyond Victory" in which he discusses human performance and development with his guests.

Personality and driving style
Journalists describe Rosberg as articulate, one who speaks with "Germanic precision" and has "more than a hint of canny PR-iness, distributing praise with diligent equality and seasoning his narrative with caveats when required." He has avoided appearing to be courageous to impress others, and some saw him as detrimental to Formula One's goal to attract new fans due to a perceived lack of personality and his commitment to fitness. Nicknamed "Britney" after the singer Britney Spears by his colleagues at Williams for sporting blonde hair, Rosberg is shy in private, reserved, quiet, and has a dry and sarcastic wit, which has occasionally "played out with a deft finesse." He has been called charming, shrewd, intelligent, focused, and photogenic. Rosberg prefers to be challenged for structuring, and is an avid reader of books that further his knowledge. His wealthy and cosmopolitan Monegasque upbringing, coupled with his polyglotism led him to describe himself as an "International German."

Throughout his career, Rosberg had a strong work ethic, talking to engineers and mechanics, and approached each circuit with the care of a cartographer. Formula One pundits regarded Rosberg as "among the most promising emergent stars of what some already call 'the Lewis generation'." The media and fans compared him initially to the 1982 world champion, his father Keke. That comparison lessened as his career progressed; he refused to discuss the comparison with the press and the difficulty in attempting to achieve as much success as his father was rarely mentioned. When Rosberg was Michael Schumacher's teammate at Mercedes, he was highly cautious about what he said to the off-track press, fearing that they could misinterpret his words.

Rosberg had a scientific and technical driving style; he sought to fine-tune his car in specific detail and adapted his driving ability around the changes, especially over a single lap. He shared his father's preference of oversteer over understeer and lacked a flamboyant driving technique. Rosberg's qualifying preparations would be compromised in the event that he leaned towards a race setup; he analysed the situation and attempted to optimise his driving style to win races. He occasionally used more of the circuit, using his car's ride over a bumpy track to ask the car to take as much as possible. Rosberg was sometimes unable to cope with the stress of extra complications, causing him to overdrive in the process, but was adept at managing technical issues on his car. Will Buxton, a motorsport commentator and pundit, described him as "quick from the outset" and a driver who "was so impressive; seemingly effortlessly rapid and blessed with a precision that was metronomic."

Helmet design and car number
For the 2014 season, the FIA created a new sporting regulation to allow a driver to select a unique car number for use throughout their Formula One career. Rosberg selected number six because it was his wife and father's lucky number. He also changed the colour of his helmet after eight years from yellow to dark grey. The overall design included chrome, some Buddhist influence, clean lines, and personal symbols; it was designed by Jens Munser.

Endorsements and philanthropy
Creative Artists Agency (CAA), through its sports division CAA Sports, represents Rosberg's commercial ventures. From 2010 to 2015, he was associated with the jewellery and watch brand Thomas Sabo, and the luxury travel accessory maker Tumi. Rosberg signed numerous endorsement contracts; some of the companies with which he has done business are the watchmakers Rolex, International Watch Company and Oris, the tyre maker Continental Tire, the luxury fashion house Hugo Boss, the toy car company Hot Wheels, the railway company Deutsche Bahn, and the media broadcasters Sky Sports and RTL. As a result of Rosberg's endorsement money and Mercedes salary, he was listed as one of the world's highest-paid athletes by Forbes in 2016.

Rosberg is an ambassador for Mercedes-Benz, Laureus, the investment bank UBS, the Tribute to Bambi Foundation, and the electric car manufacturer Schaeffler Group. He is part of the alcohol brewing company Heineken's anti-drink-drive campaign, including appearing with his father in an advertisement for zero-alcohol beer in 2020.

In 2012, Rosberg teamed with the children's aid organisation Ein Herz für Kinder (German: A Heart for Children) and has raised capital for the charity through various events. Rosberg has worked for the Viva con Agua de Sankt Pauli charity, which supplies water and basic sanitation to individuals in developing countries. In response to the murder of George Floyd, in June 2020, Rosberg donated €10,000 to the NAACP Legal Defense and Educational Fund to aid its efforts in educating the public on racism and ending segregation. He invested money into projects involving reforestation in Germany and the promotion of South American sustainable agro-forestry.

Achievements and recognition
On 5 June 2011 Rosberg received the Lorenzo Bandini Trophy, which honours a recipient "for their dedication to motor racing, spirit of competition and achievements". At the 2014 Brazilian Grand Prix, he won the inaugural FIA Pole Trophy for winning more pole positions than any other driver during the 2014 season with 11. Rosberg won the DHL Fastest Lap Award because he recorded seven fastest laps, more than any other driver during the 2016 season.

Rosberg won the Bambi Best Sportsman Award in 2014, the Sport Bild Special Award 2014, the 2016 BRDC Johnny Wakefield Trophy for "setting the fastest race lap of the season on the Silverstone Grand Prix Circuit", the Autosport International Racing Driver Award in the same year, the 2016 ADAC Motorsportsman of the Year Award, the 2017 Laureus World Sports Award for Breakthrough of the Year, the DMSB Cup from the German Motor Sport Federation (German: Deutscher Motor Sport Bund; DMSB) that same year, and the 2018 Special Prize Entrepreneur of the Year at the GreenTec Awards. Rosberg was inducted into the FIA Hall of Fame in December 2017.

Racing record

Career summary

Complete Formula 3 Euro Series results
(key) (Races in bold indicate pole position; races in italics indicate fastest lap; small number denotes the finishing position)

Complete GP2 Series results
(key) (Races in bold indicate pole position; races in italics indicate fastest lap; small number denotes the finishing position)

Complete Formula One results
(key) (Races in bold indicate pole position; races in italics indicate fastest lap; small number denotes the finishing position)

 Driver failed to finish the race but was classified since he had completed more than 90% of the race distance.
 Half points awarded because less than 75% of race distance was completed.

Notes and references

Notes

References

External links

 
 
 
 
 

1985 births
Living people
German people of Finnish descent
Finnish expatriates in Monaco
Finnish racing drivers
Formula 3 Euro Series drivers
Formula BMW ADAC drivers
German Formula One drivers
Formula One race winners
Formula One World Drivers' Champions
German racing drivers
GP2 Series Champions
GP2 Series drivers
Karting World Championship drivers
Mercedes-Benz Formula One drivers
Sportspeople from Wiesbaden
Racing drivers from Hesse
Williams Formula One drivers
People named in the Panama Papers
Finnish people of German descent
Team Rosberg drivers
ART Grand Prix drivers
Motorsport team owners
Carlin racing drivers
German expatriate sportspeople in Monaco